Ibrahim Kassas is a Tunisian politician and one of the 217 members of the Constituent Assembly of Tunisia.

Biography

Professional career 
Young, he left Tunisia to have a turn in Europe and found himself in Iraq where he found a job and met his wife. Later, he came back to his country where his life condition was hard. There, he worked as truck driver and afterwards became a driver of share taxis with the help of Kebili governor.

Political career 
He had no knowledge of politics but learnt as he watched television. Thereafter, he engaged in the election of the constituent assembly and got elected. He does not hesitate to criticize the government, constituent assembly and the president of the Republic. He quickly became famous for his interventions broadcast on TV.

References 

Living people
Tunisian politicians
Year of birth missing (living people)